Nataxa amblopis is a moth of the Anthelidae family. It was described by Turner in 1944. It is found in Australia.

References

Moths described in 1944
Anthelidae
Moths of Australia